Sky Castle (stylized as SKY Castle) is a 2018–2019 South Korean television series starring Yum Jung-ah, Lee Tae-ran, Yoon Se-ah, Oh Na-ra, and Kim Seo-hyung. It aired on JTBC on Fridays and Saturdays, from November 23, 2018, to February 1, 2019.

At the time of airing, Sky Castle was the highest rated drama in Korean cable television history. The drama received positive reviews from critics and won multiple awards, including four at the 55th Baeksang Arts Awards.

Synopsis
A satirical series that closely looks at the materialistic desires of upper-class parents in South Korea and how they ruthlessly secure the successes of their families at the cost of destroying others' lives. The drama revolves around the lives of housewives residing in a luxurious residential area called SKY Castle (a reference to the elite universities) in suburban Seoul, where wealthy doctors and professors live. The wives are determined to make their husbands more successful and to raise their children to be top students who will be accepted at the best universities, so they use every possible way to get that.

Han Seo-jin (Yum Jung-ah) is married to an ambitious doctor, Kang Joon-sang (Jung Joon-ho). She wants her eldest daughter, Kang Ye-seo (Kim Hye-yoon), to also become a doctor. In order to do that, she hires Kim Joo-young (Kim Seo-hyung), a coordinator with a one hundred percent success rate when it comes to her students' admission to the Seoul National University.

No Seung-hye (Yoon Se-ah) is the wife of Cha Min-hyuk (Kim Byung-chul), a perfectionist law professor. She does not like the way her husband teaches their twin sons, Cha Seo-joon (Kim Dong-hee) and Cha Ki-joon (Jo Byeong-kyu). Later it is revealed that their daughter, Cha Se-ri (Park Yoo-na), who has always been Min-hyuk's pride since she attends Harvard University, hides something from them.

Jin Jin-hee (Oh Na-ra) is the mother of Woo Soo-han (Lee Eugene). She wants her son to be like her husband, Woo Yang-woo (Jo Jae-yoon), which means becoming a doctor. She befriends Seo-jin to get information and to achieve a perfect career and education for her family.

Following the suicide of Lee Myung-joo (Kim Jung-nan), mother of Park Young-jae (Song Geon-hee), who was a former student of Joo-young and recently admitted to the Seoul National University, Lee Soo-im (Lee Tae-ran)'s family moves into SKY Castle. Her husband, Hwang Chi-young (Choi Won-young), works at the same hospital as Joon-sang and Yang-woo and her son, Hwang Woo-joo (Kang Chan-hee), attends the same school as Ye-seo. Her family often clashes with the other residents due to their differences in opinions.

Cast

Main
 Yum Jung-ah as Han Seo-jin/Kwak Mi-hyang
 An overzealous mother who wants nothing more than for her daughter to get into Seoul National University's medical school. She hides her past from everyone except her husband and in-laws who know that she grew up poor with an alcoholic father who sold oxblood and offal. She is the mother of Kang Ye-seo and Kang Ye-bin; the wife of Kang Joon-sang and the daughter-in-law of Madame Yoon.
 Lee Tae-ran as Lee Soo-im
 A new member of the neighborhood disapproves of the other parents' methods for getting their kids to university, believing it is too harsh. She is disliked by the other parents for disrupting the status quo. She is aware of Seo-jin's real identity, as she knew her when they were younger. She is the stepmother of Hwang Woo-joo; the wife of Hwang Chi-young.
 Yoon Se-ah as No Seung-hye 
 A woman who befriends Soo-im, and starts to look down on how the other moms treat everyone and their kids. She changes her ways and becomes protective of her sons from their father's harsh teaching methods. She is the mother of Cha Se-ri, Cha Seo-joon, and Cha Ki-joon; the wife of Cha Min-hyuk
 Oh Na-ra as Jin Jin-hee
 A friend of Seo-jin tries to get her child to do everything with Seo-jin's daughter so he can be successful. She bribes Seo-jin with gifts into trusting her with information. But she finds it difficult to keep secrets. Her loyalty changes easily as well depending on who she is with. She is the mother of Woo Soo-han; the wife of Woo Yang-woo.
 Kim Seo-hyung as Kim Joo-young
 She is a well-known tutor only accessible to the elite and only caters to two students at a time. Because of her 100% success rate in getting students accepted, Seo-jin was determined to hire her as her daughter's tutor. She tutored Young-jae and Ye-seo. She hides a past that she tries to escape from. She has a daughter, Kay (or Katherine), who was an acclaimed genius when they lived in Fairfax.

Supporting

Kang family
 Jung Joon-ho as Kang Joon-sang
 Seo-jin's husband. Surgeon at Joonam University Hospital. He holds Min-hyuk in absolute contempt and delights in the latter's misfortunes. He is very ambitious and is obsessed with maintaining a good track record to elevate his status in the hospital. He will stop at nothing in order to get rivals out of the way.
 Kim Hye-yoon as Kang Ye-seo
 Seo-jin's elder daughter. Her dream is to enter Seoul National University's medical faculty and be a third generation doctor. She is very impulsive and is as determined as her father in achieving her goals. She has feelings for Woo-joo.
 Lee Ji-won as Kang Ye-bin
 Seo-jin's younger daughter. She is cynical and often clashes with her sister and believes her parents only care for Ye-seo. She, however, gets along well with the other children in the complex and is the first one in the family to warm up to Hye-na.
 Jung Ae-ri as Madame Yoon
 Joon-sang's mother. She is the one who pushed Seo-jin to bring Ye-seo to the top in order to have a third generation doctor in the family.

Hwang family
 Choi Won-young as Hwang Chi-young
 Soo-im's husband. Surgeon at Joonam University Hospital. Rival of Joon-sang. He grew up at an orphanage owned by Soo-im's parents. After Woo-joo's birth mother passed away, he remarried Soo-im.
 Kang Chan-hee as Hwang Woo-joo
 Soo-im's stepson whom she treats as her own son. He likes Hye-na, and is liked by Ye-seo. A kind student who always helps others that have difficulties.

Cha family
 Kim Byung-chul as Cha Min-hyuk
 Seung-hye's husband. A law school lecturer and former prosecutor. He is strict with his children and holds very high expectations of them, especially academically.
 Park Yoo-na as Cha Se-ri
 Seung-hye's daughter. She is a marketing director of a nightclub. She lied about being a Harvard University student and got caught by her parents. 
 Kim Dong-hee as Cha Seo-joon
 Seung-hye's elder son; a twin of Ki-joon. A classmate of Woo-joo. Even though he is calmer than his younger twin, he strongly dislikes his father's method of teaching and studying.
 Jo Byeong-kyu as Cha Ki-joon
 Seung-hye's younger son; a twin of Seo-joon. He likes to play tricks on Ye-seo. He strongly dislikes his father's method of teaching and studying.
 Kim Joo-ryoung as Noh Seon-hye
 Seung-hye's elder sister. She lives in New York, taking care of her niece Se-ri who moved to the United States.

Woo family
 Jo Jae-yoon as Woo Yang-woo
 Jin-hee's husband. An orthopaedics surgeon. He is very obedient to Kang Joon-sang, but he also admires Hwang Chi-young.
 Yoo Jin-woo as Woo Soo-han
 Jin-hee's son. He is not interested in studying, but still tries his best under huge academic pressure. Soo-han has a crush on Ye-bin.

People around Joo-young
 Lee Hyun-jin as Jo Tae-jun 
 Joo-young's secretary.
 Jo Mi-nyeo as Kay/Katherine 
 Kim Joo-young's daughter. As a result of a car accident that caused her serious brain damage, she became mentally ill. Implied to have savant syndrome.

Others
 Kim Bo-ra as Kim Hye-na 
 Sinah Secondary School student. She is treated as an enemy by Ye-seo. She has no feelings toward Hwang Woo-joo. 
 Woo Ji-hyun as Jeon Jin-man	
 Neurosurgery resident
 Song Min-hyung as Choi In-ho
 Medical superintendent of Joonam University Hospital.
 Lee Yeon-soo as Kim Eun-hye
 Hye-na's mother. She used to be Joon-sang's girlfriend, but they broke up after his mother's rejection.
 Yoo Yeon as Laura Jung

Park family
 Kim Jung-nan as Lee Myung-joo
 A former resident of SKY Castle, she committed suicide after her son ran away to his secret girlfriend.
 Song Geon-hee as Park Young-jae 
 Myung-joo's son. After his mother's death, he wants to reconcile with his father, Park Soo-chang.
 Yu Seong-ju as Park Soo-chang 
 Myung-joo's husband and Young-jae's father. At first, he is harsh and abusive towards Young-jae, but after his wife's death he wants to reconcile with his son.
 Lee Yun-seol as Lee Ga-eul
 Young-jae's girlfriend. She is 6 years older than him and was hired as a housekeeper by Myung-joo, coming from a low-class family. Myung-joo disapproved of her status and her relationship with Young-jae.
 Kwon Hwa-woon as Lee Choong-sun
 Shin Cheol-jin an elder at Soo-chang's cabin.
 Like Soo-chang, he also has a son that committed suicide after being admitted to SNU with the aid of Kim Joo-young.

Special appearance
 Im Chan-mi as herself (ep. 3–4)

Episodes

Production
 The first script reading of the casts took place in August, 2018 at JTBC Building in Sangam-dong, Seoul, South Korea. 
 Most of the filming took place in Yongin, Gyeonggi Province. 
 When the series was still in development, its working title was Princess Maker. 
 Kim Jung-eun was offered one of the lead roles but she declined the offer. 
 The series was extended from 16 to 20 episodes even before it started broadcasting.
 Yum Jung-ah and Kim Bo-ra previously starred together in Royal Family (2011).

Original soundtrack

Part 1Part 2Part 3Part 4Part 5Part 6Part 7

Reception

Critical reception
The drama series has drawn positive reviews as a dark comedy that casts light on some of the furtive and controversial aspects of Korean society. It has also stimulated explosive responses from viewers due to its relatable storyline over Korea's competitive education system. Culture critic Jung Duk-hyun says the drama has received attention from viewers, because it successfully strikes an uneasy chord while heightening viewers' curiosity over the lengths to which rich elite families obsess over education. He also says
"In terms of education, the drama satisfies people's desire to peek into what those closed rich family circles do for their children. But at the same time, viewers feel uneasiness when watching their stories. Those two conflicting emotions, 'wanting to know but feeling uncomfortable' makes for some interesting chemistry in the minds of drama fans and puts it on the must-see drama list." The drama also gained popularity in China, where similar issues over a hyper-competitive education system and the pressure to enter into a prestigious university exist.

Inciting murder accusation and leaks 
The drama ignited a controversy for allegedly "inciting" the murder of psychiatrist Lim Se-won, as it aired a scene in which a patient chases after a doctor with a knife in his hand due to a grievance over his operation results.

Following the broadcast of episode 14 on January 5, several Korean netizens on online communities came up with their own theories about what would happen in the next episode. One netizen's theory was supported by what appeared to be a photo of the drama's cue sheet, and another theory was formed based on the character description in a recruitment notice for a new role in the drama. When episode 15 aired on January 11, these theories proved to be true, making viewers question if the story was leaked.

On January 12, the producers explained that "The story was not leaked. Our viewers came up with many theories. They happened to be correct by chance, which must be why people think they are spoilers."

On January 16, controversy rose again after a netizen uploaded photos of parts of the scripts for episode 17 and 18. The fact that the name "Cha Ki-joon" was left on the script drew much attention, and the photos began to spread on online communities. After an investigation into the rumors, the producers confirmed that the scripts for episodes 17 and 18 (to be aired on January 18 and 19) had been leaked.

The production team was accused of plagiarizing the song "We All Lie" from American musician Bea Miller's song "To the Grave" featuring Mike Stud. However, JTBC denied the accusations.

Ratings
Sky Castle is currently the second-highest-rated Korean drama in cable television history. It was an unexpected commercial hit, rising from 1% viewership ratings to double-digit viewership ratings percentage, as well as topping the Contents Power Index (CPI) rankings as well as the TV popularity ranking in Korea. Besides its popularity in South Korea, the series also gained immense popularity in China.

In popular culture
The word SKY is an acronym used to refer to the three most prestigious universities in South Korea: Seoul National University, Korea University, and Yonsei University. The term is widely used in South Korea, both in media broadcast and by the universities themselves.

In South Korea, admission to one of the SKY universities is widely considered as determining one's career and social status. Many of the country's most influential politicians, lawyers, physicians, engineers, journalists, professors, and bureaucrats have graduated from one of the SKY universities.

Awards and nominations

Notes

References

External links
  
 
 

Korean-language television shows
2018 South Korean television series debuts
JTBC television dramas
South Korean comedy-drama television series
2019 South Korean television series endings
Television shows set in Seoul
Works about education
Television series by HB Entertainment
Television series by Drama House